Annona scleroderma, the cawesh or poshe-te, is a species of tree in the Annonaceae family, with an edible fruit the size of an orange. The cream-colored flesh of the fruit has a creamy banana-pineapple flavor, and a soft texture. The fruit's tough skin makes it particularly easy to handle. The fruit is little known outside its native region. It reaches 15 to 20 meters tall. Its pollen is shed as permanent tetrads. 

Its native range is the Atlantic coast of Central America, from Mexico and Guatemala to Honduras. It is not widely cultivated (except in certain parts of Guatemala). A tree grown from seed takes about four years until it produces any fruit.

References

scleroderma
Tropical fruit
Taxa named by Jean-Baptiste Lamarck